The 1935 Kentucky Derby was the 61st running of the Kentucky Derby. The race took place on May 4, 1935.

Full results

References

1935
Kentucky Derby
Derby
Kentucky